The following is a list of episodes from the NBC sitcom Night Court. The series originally aired from January 4, 1984 to May 13, 1992 during 9 seasons with 193 episodes produced and a 10th season was ordered in September 2021 and it premiered on January 17, 2023 that stars Melissa Rauch as the new lead character Abby Stone, the daughter of the late Judge Harry Stone. John Larroquette has also returned in the role of former prosecutor Dan Fielding as well.

Series overview

Episodes

Season 1 (1984)

Season 2 (1984–85)

Season 3 (1985–86)

Season 4 (1986–87)

Season 5 (1987–88)

Season 6 (1988–89)

Season 7 (1989–90)

Season 8 (1990–91)

Season 9 (1991–92)

Notes

References

External links

Lists of American sitcom episodes